Legiendamm is a street in Berlin, Germany. The street is parallel to Leuschnerdamm and borders an accumulation pond of the former Luisenstadt Canal. It is named after Carl Legien and was previously called as Luisenufer. Notable features include  and a bust of Carl Legien.

References

External links
 

Friedrichshain-Kreuzberg
Mitte
Streets in Berlin